Dianne Margaret Zorn-Rodger (born 9 November 1956) is a retired middle-distance runner from Napier, New Zealand. She competed in the 1500m at the 1976 Summer Olympics and in the 3000 m at the 1984 Summer Olympics and placed ninth in 1984. She married the New Zealand rower Dave Rodger.  In 1984, they became the first New Zealand married couple to compete at Olympics.

After the 1976 Olympics, she had long breaks from major competitions due to multiple injuries. She recovered by 1982, and that year placed fourth in the 1500m and 3000m events at the Commonwealth Games and finished fifth at the World Athletics Cross Country Championships.

Zorn graduated from the William Colenso College in Napier, and already at the age 13 qualified for the national cross-country running championships. After marriage, she moved to Hamilton, and often competed in the marathon and cross-country races in the United States. She retired after suffering a stress fracture in 1988, and later gave birth to a daughter Aynslee (b. 1989) and sons Logan (b. 1992) and Brenton (b. 1997). Logan competed internationally for New Zealand in rowing, and Aynslee played American football and Australian rules football for New South Wales.

References

New Zealand female middle-distance runners
1956 births
Living people
Olympic athletes of New Zealand
Athletes (track and field) at the 1976 Summer Olympics
Athletes (track and field) at the 1984 Summer Olympics
Athletes (track and field) at the 1982 Commonwealth Games
Commonwealth Games competitors for New Zealand
People educated at William Colenso College